Querido diario (Natacha) is a children's book by Argentine author Luis Pescetti. It was first published in 2007.

Books in the same series are:

Natacha (novel)
La tarea según Natacha
¡Buenísimo, Natacha! 
Chat, Natacha, chat 
Bituín bituín Natacha 
Querido diario (Natacha) 
La enciclopedia de las Chicas Perla 
Te amo, lectura (Natacha) 
Nuestro planeta, Natacha

References

Books by Luis Pescetti
2007 novels
2007 children's books
Argentine novels